Robert Fesh (born June 7, 1937) is an American politician in the state of New Hampshire. He is a former member of the New Hampshire House of Representatives, sitting as a Republican from the Rockingham 6 district, having been first elected in 1987.

References

1937 births
Living people
Members of the New Hampshire House of Representatives